Podolets is a rural locality (a selo) in Krasnoselskoye Rural Settlement, Yuryev-Polsky District, Vladimir Oblast, Russia. The population was 291 as of 2010. There are 3 streets.

Geography 
Podolets is located 28 km northeast of Yuryev-Polsky (the district's administrative centre) by road. Svaino is the nearest rural locality.

References 

Rural localities in Yuryev-Polsky District